Red Wagon is a 1930 novel by the British writer Lady Eleanor Smith. It is set in a circus company where the owner becomes involved in a love triangle with a lion tamer and a gypsy girl while the circus tours Continental Europe. It was first published by Victor Gollancz in the UK and by Bobbs-Merrill in the US.

Film adaptation

In 1933 the story was made into a film by British International Pictures. It was directed by Paul L. Stein and starred Charles Bickford, Raquel Torres, Greta Nissen and Anthony Bushell.

References

Bibliography
 Bergfelder, Tim & Cargnelli, Christian. Destination London: German-speaking emigrés and British cinema, 1925-1950. Berghahn Books, 2008.

1930 British novels
British novels adapted into films
Circus books
Novels by Lady Eleanor Smith
Victor Gollancz Ltd books
Bobbs-Merrill Company books